The Syria national under-20 football team is the national football youth team of Syria and is controlled by the Syrian Football Association. It is considered the feeder team to the Syria national football team.

Competition records

FIFA U-20 World Cup Record

<div style="text-align:left">

AFC U-20 Asian Cup Record

<div style="text-align:left">

Current squad 
The following 23 players were named in the final squad for the 2023 AFC U-20 Asian Cup on 25 February 2023.

Head coach:  Mark Wotte

Previous squads
1989 FIFA World Youth Championship squads - Syria
1991 FIFA World Youth Championship squads - Syria
2005 FIFA World Youth Championship squads - Syria

Honours

Titles
 FIFA U-20 World Cup
Sixth place: 1991
 AFC U-20 Asian Cup
Winners (1): 1994
Runners-up (1): 1988
Third place (1): 1990
Fourth place (1): 2004

See also 
Syria national football team
Syria national under-23 football team
Syria national under-17 football team
Syrian Football Association
Football in Syria

References

Under-20
Asian national under-20 association football teams